Pandit Rabin Ghosh (1932–2010), a 20th-century violin virtuoso of 'Seni-Maihar' Gharana (Seni-Maihar School of thoughts) of North Indian Classical Music, India, was a disciple of Baba Ustad Allauddin Khan Saheb.
He was noted for his unique style of playing 'Ati-Vilambit' (very slow movement applicable to 'Alap' and 'Vilambit Gat' of a raga, a very prime feature to the Indian classical music) with an extensive use of 'Micro-Tone' (application of 'Shruti') to imitate the Indian Singing style.

Early life

Rabin Ghosh hailed from a family with a strong musical background. His father was an Engineer and played Flute and Esraj (an Indian string instrument). From a very early age, Rabin Ghosh was influenced by the musical atmosphere, which drove him into playing Esraj, Flute, and Tabla (an Indian percussion instrument). He finally focused on Violin, under the guidance of Mr. Mani Majumder, one of the renowned violinists of the contemporary time of Western Classical Music.

After continuous training on Western Classical Music he shifted to North Indian Classical Music under the guidance of 'Sangeetacharya' Haripada Chattopadhay, exponent violinist of 'Dagar Gharana' (Dagar school of thoughts) of North Indian Classical Music.
Rabin Ghosh continued his training more than a decade under the tutelage of Haripada Chattopadhay.
During this time he not only won violin Competitions, also performed in concerts along with All India Radio, Calcutta.

Way to Maihar 
In the year 1955, Rabin Ghosh got an opportunity to play violin before Baba Allauddin Khan Saheb (at the time of visiting Calcutta), the doyen of Hindustani Classical Music. He played Raga Mian ki Todi before him. Baba Allauddin Khan Saheb was satisfied to accept him as his disciple. In the mid of 1955, Rabin Ghosh left for Maihar.

Life at Maihar 
Life at Maihar for Rabin Ghosh was very dedicated. Besides receiving training from Baba Allauddin Khan Saheb, he was appointed as a teacher of Maihar Government Music College.
Rabin Ghosh had a very strict and long duration practice session which he maintained till the last day in Maihar. In his own words "I used to light a thick fragrance stick and would continue practice till it burned out totally".

Contribution 
At that time, Rabin Ghosh's practice sessions lasted about 12 hours a day but reached a peak of 14 to 16 hours a day. During his stay at Maihar over seven and half years, he experimented with different techniques on violin sound production and researched sitting posture which helped with the long duration of practice sessions.

Invention of 5th string on violin 
During the years of rigorous training under the tutelage of Baba Alauddin Khan Saheb in Maihar, Rabin Ghosh was inspired to 'Design and Develop Five-String Violin'. 
The need to access and explore the lower octave in expressing the mood of Raga RamDashi Malhar, in 1958, the young artist Rabin Ghosh, had an extensive experimentation, which augmented 4 string violin to 5 string violin without compromising the original tonal quality of conventional violin.
For Five-String Violin he used to use 1st string 'E’ as 'Rishav' (higher octave), 2nd string 'A’ as 'Pancham' (middle octave), 3rd string 'D’ as 'Saraj' (middle octave), 4th string 'G’ as 'Madhyam' (lower octave), and 5th string 'C’ as 'Komol Nishad' (lower octave). From 1960, Rabin Ghosh used 'Five String Violin' starting with his performances at Tansen Sangeet Sanmelan, Calcutta.

Resting violin on case 
Rabin Ghosh's playing style was enriched with the amalgamation of singing as well as tantrakari. He used to use extensive 'Micro-Tone' (application of 'Shruti') to imitate the Indian Singing style.
Another distinct feature of his playing style was holding the violin. He used his 'specially made violin case' for resting his violin. He realised that playing could be more comfortable if the instrument is held from the both end facilitating to play finest Meend (sliding), Gamak and other technical applications. 
Other aspect was to avoid the 'Excessive Flexion' of the vertebral column of the performer, instead of resting violin somewhere of the body.

Introduction of Tala 
Maestro Rabin Ghosh composed 'Someswara Tala' imagining the dancing posture of Nataraj, of 11 Beats, having division of 3 – 2 – 3 – (1.5 + 1.5).

Composition 
Going beyond the periphery of performing and teaching Maestro Rabin Ghosh has put his earnest endeavour to compose a few orchestrations on Indian Classical Music. During his tenure in Maihar, when he was completely engulfed in receiving training in Indian Classical Music from Baba Alauddin Khan Saheb, the motif kindled within his heart a unique feeling which prompted him to compose some pieces on Indian Classical Ragas completely orchestrated. 
The ragas in which he explored himself are Zila Kafi, Bhupali, Kirwani, Khamaj etc. His honest effort to con flux two parallel voices in a composition tuned out to be a grand success. Abhisarika, Niharika, Sanchari and more such compositions shaped between 1973 and 1992 and were staged by his disciples from time to time. A compact disc album named 'Niharika' played by his disciples was released with orchestral works.

Recordings 
From 1970 and 1972 The Gramophone Company of India Limited (HMV) released Three Long Playing Discs. The stereo recordings consists solo performance of Raga Pahari Jhinjhoti, Raga Ahir Bhairav by Rabin Ghosh, Raga Gunkali with Himangshu Biswas in Flute, Patdeep (Dhun). HMV released a disk consists of Raga Brindabani Sarang,Raga Bageshree by Rabin Ghosh with Himangshu Biswas (Flute), Dinesh ch. Chandra (Sitar) and Shyamal Bose (Tabla).

Publication 
Maestro Rabin Ghosh published a book 'Swarankan Sanghati' – integration of notation system, where he described and analysed the common features as well as comparison and method of translating music between Indian Classical Music Notation System and Western Classical Music Notation System.

Teaching career 
Maestro Rabin Ghosh established a new dimension in the field of Indian Classical Music on Violin. As a result, he was associated with Ali Akbar College of Music, Calcutta, Tansen Music College as teacher of violin.

Rabin Ghosh was associated with Rabindra Bharati University as lecturer of Instrumental Music Department. He held the position of Examiner for Vishwa Bharati University and for Prayag Sangit Samiti. Maestro Ghosh also gave many Lecture-Demonstrations in various places, including in the Department of Music of Emory University, and Sacramento state University, California, USA.

Awards and achievements 
Awarded certificate for standing first in the Baranagar Music Competition on Indian Classical Music by the Baranagar Godhuli Sangha, Calcutta (presently Kolkata), West Bengal in 1946.

Awarded certificate for standing first in 'All Bengal Music Competition' on Indian Classical Music. And has also received prestigious 'Tulsidas Chatterjee Medal' for outstanding performance in the competition, Calcutta (presently Kolkata), in 1950.

Awarded 'Sangeet Prabesikha' and certified for standing first in Indian Classical Music by All India Music Conference Trust, Calcutta (presently Kolkata), in 1953.

Awarded 'Sangeet Gunakar' by the All India Music Conference, in 1954.

Awarded certificate for standing first in the 'All India Music Competition on Indian Classical Music', Allahabad, in 1954.

Awarded 'Sangeet Prabhakar' with gold medal and certified for standing first, Allahabad, in 1966.
Awarded 'Sangeet Dishari' title from the 'Critic Association' for two consecutive years.

Awarded 'Sur Moni' title from Bombay (Mumbai).

Honored with Gold Medal by All India Music Conference.

Awarded Three Gold Medals in Berlin Festival in 1973 in Berlin, Germany.

Awarded 'Sangeet Pravin' with three gold medals and certified for standing first, Allahabad, in 1982.

Awarded title 'Sangeet Sagaram' by the Hon'ble Finance Minister of Tamil Nadu for the Cultural Centre of Performing Arts, Madras (Chennai), in 1986.

But Maestro Rabin Ghosh is a musician whose eminence cannot be measured in gold medals and titles alone. His ultimate value in the perfection and sublimity of the music that flows with such easy grace and sweetness from the depths of his heart through his violin to our souls.

References 
Ranjan Ghosh "About me"
The musical legacy of Brahman Baria

1932 births
2010 deaths
Hindustani instrumentalists
Indian violinists
Maihar gharana
Bengali musicians
20th-century violinists
20th-century Indian musicians